Bad Family is a 2010 Finnish drama film written and directed by Aleksi Salmenperä and produced by Aki Kaurismäki. The film tells the story of an overly protective and controlling father who suspects incest is taking place between his own son and daughter. These growing suspicions and concerns cause the father to become delusional and unrelenting in his quest to end the love affair between his children.

Distributed domestically by Sandrew Metronome, Bad Family was theatrically released in Finland on 29 January 2010. From 14 to 21 February 2010 it was screened at the 60th Berlin International Film Festival.

Plot
After a divorce a father, Mikael Lindgren, raises his son, Daniel, on his own.  His ex-wife, Laura, has custody over his daughter, Tilda.  When Laura dies, Daniel and Tilda finally meet again.

Cast
 Ville Virtanen — Mikael Lindberg
 Lauri Tilkanen — Daniel
 Pihla Viitala — Tilda
 Vera Kiiskinen — Laura
 Niki Seppälä — Milo
 Ismo Kallio — Jaan

Critical response
In a review of the film, Jonathan Romney of Screen Daily called Salmenperä's storyline a "confident study of family trauma" and proclaimed the film "a compelling, sometimes darkly witty drama." Alissa Simon of Variety magazine stated that Bad Family has a "perversely fascinating start" after which the "darkly comic psychodrama goes plain psycho". She commended the "serious thesping by the three principals" for suggesting "psychological depth" but concluded that "the script eventually leaves them high and dry" and that "[Bad Family] loses its way at the midpoint, becoming a tonal roller-coaster that skitters to a stop."

See also
2010 in film
Cinema of Finland
List of Finnish films: 2000s
Genetic sexual attraction

References

External links
 
 
 Bad Family at Box Office Mojo

2010 films
Finnish drama films
Incest in film
Films about siblings
2010 drama films